Exhibit A: Secrets of Forensic Science was a Canadian television series highlighting the role of forensic science in solving crimes.

References

External links

1990s Canadian documentary television series
2000s Canadian documentary television series
1997 Canadian television series debuts
2001 Canadian television series endings
Discovery Channel (Canada) original programming